Wang Thonglang is one of the 50 districts (khet) of Bangkok, Thailand. It is bounded by other Bangkok districts (from north clockwise): Lat Phrao, Bang Kapi, Huai Khwang, and Chatuchak.

History
The district was established on 21 November 1997 (announced 14 October 1997) occupying Wang Thonglang and part of Khlong Chan sub-district of Bang Kapi and part of Lat Phrao sub-district of Lat Phrao district. The total area was 19.205 km2. In 2002 (announced 24 January, effective 11 March) the district boundary between Wang Thonglang and Lat Phrao districts was adjusted. Now Wang Thonglang has 18.905 km2 of area.

The name Wang Thonglang means 'the deep body of water around which Erythrina fusca grows'.

Administration
The district is sub-divided into 4 sub-districts (khwaeng).

Education

Secondary schools:
Bodindecha (Sing Singhaseni) School

International schools:
 Lycée Français International de Bangkok (French school)
 Singapore International School of Bangkok
 Regent's International School, Bangkok

District Council

The District Council for Wang Thonglang has seven members, who each serve four-year terms. Elections were last held on April 30, 2006. The results were as follows:
 Democrat Party - 7 seats

Diplomatic missions
 Embassy of Cambodia
 Embassy of Laos

Places
 Chao Phraya Bodindecha Museum
 Golden Place
 Chok Chai 4 Market

References

External links
 BMA website with the tourist landmarks of Wang Thonglang
 Wang Thonglang district office (Thai only)

 
Districts of Bangkok